St Mary's School is a private English medium, Anglican and boarding school for girls situated in the suburb of Waverley in Johannesburg in the Gauteng province of South Africa, it is one of the top and most academic schools in Gauteng.

Established in 1888, it is the oldest school in Johannesburg. It was founded by the Anglican clergyman the Rev. John T. Darragh, who also founded its brother school St John's College, Johannesburg in Houghton ten years later in 1898. 

St Mary's School writes the Independent Examinations Board exams.

Alumnae and Old Girls 

 Cindy Brown (hockey)
 Lisa-Marie Deetlefs (hockey)
 Lilian du Plessis (hockey)
 Natalie Grainger (squash)
 Claire Nitch (squash)
 Lize-Mari Retief (swimming)
 Ashley Callie
 Prue Leith
 Lerato Mbele
 Carolyn Slaughter
 Jane Dutton
 Helen Zille

Houses 

St Mary's consists of four houses, each with a different colour, which compete in inter-house events such as hockey, tennis, swimming, athletics, squash, music, debating and theatre.

Junior school houses 

 Hares (Yellow)
 Zebras (Red)
 Springboks (Green)
 Lions (Blue)

Pupils in grade 0 are placed in houses in the first term and stay throughout until grade 7

High school houses 

 Clayton (Yellow)
 Furse (Red)
 Karney (Green)
 Phelps (Blue)

The house system was introduced in 1934 and students wear their house badges on their blazers with pride. The houses are named after bishops of Johannesburg; Geoffrey Clayton 1934-1949 and Arthur Karney 1922–1933; bishop of Pretoria, Michael Furse 1909–1920 and archbishop of Cape Town, Francis Phelps 1931–1938.

See also 

 List of boarding schools

Anglican schools in South Africa
Boarding schools in South Africa
Educational institutions established in 1888
Girls' schools in South Africa
Private schools in Gauteng
Schools in Johannesburg
1888 establishments in the South African Republic